Oro Fino (Spanish for "Fine Gold") is a populated place, formerly a gold mining town near Fort Jones in the 1850s, in unincorporated Siskiyou County, California. Oro Fino addresses are all within Fort Jones.

References

Unincorporated communities in Siskiyou County, California
Ghost towns in California
Unincorporated communities in California